Ar-Raniry State Islamic University Banda Aceh (Bahasa Indonesia: Universitas Islam Negeri Ar-Raniry Banda Aceh or it is simply called UIN Ar-Raniry (UINAR), is a public Islamic university in Banda Aceh, Aceh Province, Indonesia. The University is run under the auspices of the Ministry of Religious Affairs of the Republic of Indonesia.

Campus
Campus on syeikh abdul rauf Street in Banda Aceh Aceh Darussalam. (the main campus) comprises the Rectorate Building, Main Library, administrative offices, main auditorium, the guest house, the Student Center, Center for Integrated Laboratory, Bank Mandiri, BNI Bank, BRI Bank, and nine faculty buildings.

History 
The birth of IAIN Ar-Raniry was preceded by the establishment of the Faculty of Shari'ah in 1960 and the Faculty of Tarbiyah in 1962 as a branch of IAIN Sunan Kalidjaga Yogyakarta. In addition, in the same year (1962), Ushuluddin Faculty was also established as a private faculty in Banda Aceh. After a few years as a branch of IAIN Yogyakarta, the faculties sprang to IAIN Syarif Hidayatullah Jakarta for six months until IAIN Ar-Raniry was inaugurated. At the time of inauguration on October 5, 1963, with the issuance of Decree of the Minister of Religious Affairs of the Republic of Indonesia No. 89 of 1963.

As the third IAIN in the archipelago after IAIN Sunan Kalidjaga Yogyakarta and IAIN Syarif Hidayatullah Jakarta, IAIN Ar-Raniry continues to advance and develop. When IAIN Ar-Raniry was inaugurated (October 5, 1963) it has only three faculties, namely Faculty of Shari'ah, Faculty of Tarbiyah and Ushuluddin Faculty, but only 5 years old was inaugurated also Faculty of Da'wah (1968) as the faculty of Da'wah in the IAIN neighborhood in Indonesia. In 1968, IAIN Ar-Raniry was appointed as the parent of two state-run religious faculties in Medan (the forerunner of IAIN North Sumatra), the Faculty of Tarbiyah and Syari'ah which lasted for 5 years.

To match with other IAIN-IAIN, in 1983, the Adab Faculty officially became one of the 5 faculties in the IAIN Ar-Raniry neighborhood.

IAIN is an abbreviation of the State Islamic Institute and the Ar-Raniry word attributed to IAIN Banda Aceh is the name of a great Ulama and mufti who was very influential on the time of Sultan Iskandar Tsani (reigned in 1637-1641). The great scholar is the full name of Sheikh Nur al-Din Ar-Raniry from Ranir (now Rander) in Gujarat, India. He has made a very valuable contribution to the development of Islamic thought in Southeast Asia, especially in Aceh.

In its historical standing, IAIN Ar-Raniry as an institution of higher education, has demonstrated its strategic role and significance for development and development of society. Its evenly distributed alumni are found in almost all government and private agencies (including outside Aceh), it is not excessive to mention that this institution has been established and is a "pocket of the Aceh community".

Founding period 

The long wait of IAIN Ar Raniry Banda Aceh to become State Islamic University (UIN) materialized. The status of the campus which is located in Kopelma Darussalam was officially increased after the publication of Presidential Regulation (Perpres) RI Number 64.

"The change of status of IAIN to UIN Ar Raniry is a special gift for Jantong Hate Campus (heart of heart) of Acehnese who is 50 years old, exactly on October 5, 2013," said special staff of IAIN Rector Ar Raniry, Saifullah Isri to Okezone in Banda Aceh, Friday (10/11/2013).

He said the Perpres dated October 1, 2013 on the increase of IAIN status into a UIN signed by President Susilo Bambang Yudhoyono, was received by his side on Thursday, October 10 at the Office of the Cabinet Secretary, Jakarta.

UIN Ar Raniry Aceh is the seventh and youngest UIN in Indonesia, after UIN Sunan Syarif Kasim. As of October 1, 2013, everything related to names, status and assets, whether fixed or mobile, including students, lecturers, and IAIN employees automatically become UIN Ar Raniry's assets.

"Gratitude Alhamdulillah, in the golden year IAIN Ar Raniry managed to carve out an important history in the development of identity, namely the change of status into a university," said Saifullah.

Rector of IAIN Ar Raniry, Prof. Farid Wajdi Ibrahim would like to thank all parties who have supported and jointly fight for the status change to UIN. According to him, UIN Ar Raniry will be inaugurated at the peak of the 50th Anniversary of IAIN Ar Raniry in an open senate meeting, along with several other activities after Eid al-Adha.
Farid said it will also open several new faculty starting next year, among them the Faculty of Economics and Islamic Business, Faculty of Social and Political Sciences, Faculty of Psychology and Counseling and Faculty of Science and Technology.

Faculties and Study Programs 

To meet the needs of higher education in accordance with the demands of society, Syarif Hidayatullah State Islamic University Jakarta opened majors and new courses to support the integration of aspects of science, Islamic and Indonesian-ness. Thus, within a decade, the university has added several new faculties, now amounting to 11 and consisting of religious-based faculty, social science-based faculty, and science-based faculty.

Faculty of Tarbiya and Teaching Sciences (Fakultas Tarbiyah dan Ilmu Keguruan, FTIK)
This faculty offers studies in the following departments and study programs: Teaching of Islamic Sciences, Teaching of Arabic Language, Islamic Educational Studies (study programs: Supervision of Islamic Education and Management of Islamic Education), Tadris (study programs: Teaching of English, Teaching of Mathematics, and Teaching of Natural Science), Teaching Diploma II, Diploma III, and Diploma IV.

Faculty of Literature and Humanities (Fakultas Adab dan Humaniora, FAH)
The Faculty of Literature and Humanities includes the following departments and study programs: Arabic Language and Literature (Sastra dan Bahasa Arab), Islamic History and Civilization (Sejarah dan Peradaban Islam), Translation (Tarjamah), and Library Sciences (Ilmu Kepustakaan).

Faculty of Usul al-Din and Philosophy (Fakultas Ushuluddin dan Filsafat, FUF)
This faculty has the following departments and study programs: Comparative Religion (Perbandingan Agama), Theology and Philosophy (Aqidah dan Filsafat), and Tafsir of Hadith (Tafsir Hadits).

Faculty of Shari'a and Law (Fakultas Syari'ah dan Hukum, FSH)
The Faculty of Shari'a has the following departments and study programs: Islamic Personal Law (study programs: Islamic Court and Administration of Personal Law Affairs), Islamic Criminal Law and Legal-Political Science (study programs: Islamic Criminal Law and Legal-Political Science), Comparative Jurisprudence and Law (study programs: Comparative Islamic Jurisprudence, Comparative Laws, and Comparative Jurisprudence and Law - Arabic Class) and Mu'amalat (study programs: Shari'a Banking and Islamic Insurance).

Faculty of Da'wa and Communication (Fakultas Da'wah dan Komunikasi, FDK)
This faculty has the following departments: Communication and Da'wa (Dakwah dan Komunikasi), Journalistic (Jurnalistik), Islamic Guidance and Counseling (Konseling dan Bimbingan Islam), Management of Da'wa (Manajemen Dakwah), and Islamic Community Development (Pengembangan Masyarakat Islam).

Faculty of Psychology (Fakultas Psikologi)
This faculty was established to train professionals with the capability to help others overcome psychological problems by using a religious approach.

Faculty of Islamic Economics and Business [Fakultas Ekonomi dan Bisnis Islam (FEBI)]
This faculty aims to develop economic sciences with Islamic characteristics, i.e., to integrate economic aspects with Islamic teachings to graduate professional scholars with a commitment to Islam. It has four study programs: Diploma of Islamic Banking (Diploma III Perbankan Syariah), Islamic Banking (Perbankan Syariah),  Islamic Economics (Ekonomi Syariah), and Economics Science (Ilmu Ekonomi). All programs have been accredited by National Accreditation Board for Higher Education (Badan Akreditasi Nasional Perguruan Tinggi): Diploma of Islamic Banking (Diploma III Perbankan Syariah) achieved an "A" score, while three other programs received "B"s. Diploma in Islamic Banking (Diploma III Perbankan Syariah) was originally managed by Faculty Shariah and Law until the FEBI was established in 2014. The three other programs were created by the administration of newly established faculty, FEBI.

Faculty of Science and Technology (Fakultas Sains dan Teknologi, FST)
This faculty is responsible for developing natural sciences and technology imbued with Islamic values. Until 2018, it has five bachelor study programs: Chemistry (Kimia), Biology (Biologi), Environmental Engineering (Teknik Lingkungan), Architecture (Arsitektur) and Information Engineering (Teknologi Informasi).

Faculty of Social and Political Science (Fakultas Ilmu Sosial dan Ilmu Politik, FISIP)

This is the newest faculty and responsible for developing the study of international relations, political sciences and sociology. It has three departments: Political Sciences (Ilmu Politik), Sociology (Sosiologi), and International Relations (Hubungan Internasional). Three of them were accredited by the Ministry of National Education in early 2012. Political Sciences and International Relations were accredited A, and Sociology B. Graduates of the departments have been working at ministries, national medias, NGOs, research centres, banking, and other important national and international companies.

Post Graduate School
The university is conducting graduate degrees at master and doctorate levels, including the program of "doctor by research". These programs have the common objective of graduating scholars who are open-minded and responsive to advances in science and technology and capable of developing religious education and conducting researches in religious sciences.

Facilities 
 Faculty of Tarbiyah and Teaching 
 Faculty of Adab and Humanities
 Faculty of Islamic Theology and Philosophy
 Faculty of Shariah and Law
 Faculty of Da'wa and Communication 
 Faculty of Economics and Business
 Faculty of Science and Technology 
 Office of the Rector 
 Office of Administration 
 Office of Academic 
 Main Auditorium 
 Hall Associate 
 Main Library 
 Book Store 
 Central of Integrated Laboratory 
 Student Center 
 Field Sports 
 Cafe Cups 
 Parking Building 
 Pensions Business 
 Bank Mandiri 
 BNI 
 BRI 
 Funeral 
 Al-Jami'ah  Mosque
 Faculty of Psychology
 Faculty of Medicine and Health Sciences
 Faculty of Social and Political Sciences
 Graduate School
 Graduate Research Libraries 
 Psychological Services Center 
 Language and Culture Center 
 National ICT Center 
 Center Study of Islam and Society (PPIM) 
 Center for the Study of Religion and Culture (CSRC) 
 Office and Training Center PTAIS Kopertais 
 Syahida Inn 
 Ma'had Aly 
 Boarding for Male Student 
 Boarding for Female Student
 Tennis Court 
 Experimental Farm 
 Parking Area 
 Boarding School Students 
 Madrasah Development 
 Ketilang Kindergarten
 Lecturer Housing Complex

Student organizations

University Level 
 KMU: Kongres Mahasiswa Universitas
 SEMA: SENAT Mahasiswa Universitas
 DEMA: DEWAN Eksekutif Mahasiswa
 UKM: Unit Kegiatan Mahasiswa
 LDK (Lembaga Dakwah Kampus)
 PRAMUKA
 MENWA (Resimen Mahasiswa)
 KSR-PMI (Korps Suka Rela - Palang Merah Indonesia)

Faculty level 
 SEMAF: SENAT Perwakilan Mahasiswa Fakultas
 DEMA: DEWAN Eksekutif Mahasiswa Fakultas

Program study level 
 DPMJ: Dewan Perwakilan Mahasiswa Jurusan/Program Studi
 BEMJ: Badan Eksekutif Mahasiswa Jurusan/Program Studi

foreign student(mahasiswa asing)
 PKPMI-CA(Persatuan kebangsaan pelajar Malaysia di indonesia cabang aceh)

Structural institutions
These are work units, for example, the existence of which are explicitly expressed in the structure of UIN organization. Such units are as follows:
Research Center
Social Service Center
Computer Center
Main Library

Enrollment 
Each new academic year, the university opens candidate registration for new students for the bachelor's degrees (S1), Magister programs (S2), and the Doctoral programs (S3). The registration opens from early February until early July. 
 
 Seleksi Bersama Masuk Perguruan Tinggi Negeri (SBMPTN Tertulis) 
 Seleksi NASIONAL Masuk Perguruan Tinggi Negeri (SBMPTN Undangan) 
 Seleksi Penerimaan Mahasiswa Bersama Mandiri (SPMB Mandiri) 
 Seleksi Penerimaan Mahasiswa Bersama Perguruan Tinggi Agama Islam Negeri (SPMB PTAIN)

References 

Website of arraniry State Islamic University bandaaceh

Education in Aceh
Universities in Indonesia
Islamic universities and colleges in Indonesia